Spondweni virus (SPOV or SPONV) is an arbovirus, or arthropod-borne virus, which is a member of the family Flaviviridae and the genus Flavivirus. It is part of the Spondweni serogroup which consists of the Sponweni virus and the Zika virus (ZIKV). The Spondweni virus was first isolated in Nigeria in 1952, and ever since, SPONV transmission and activity have been reported throughout Africa. Its primary vector of transmission is the sylvatic mosquito Aedes circumluteolus, though it has been isolated from several different types of mosquito. Transmission of the virus into humans can lead to a viral infection known as Spondweni fever, with symptoms ranging from headache and nausea to myalgia (muscle pain) and arthralgia (joint pain). However, SPONV is phylogenetically close to the ZIKV, it is commonly misdiagnosed as ZIKV along with other viral illnesses.

Virology
The Spondweni virus belongs to the family Flaviviridae and the genus Flavivirus.  Due to its phylogeny, it is related to the dengue virus, yellow fever virus, Japanese encephalitis virus, and West Nile virus. It is part of the Spondweni serogroup which also contains the Zika virus. However, in certain Spondweni virus cases, signs and symptoms can appear as early as three days after infection. Both of these viruses in the Spondweni serogroup have serological cross-reactivity and very similar clinical presentations. This is one of the primary reasons that both viruses and their correlated diseases have been misidentified and misdiagnosed.

Similar to other flaviviruses, SPONV has a positive-sense, single stranded RNA genome, which is about 11 kilobases in length. The RNA genome contains 5’ and 3’ untranslated regions that surround a single open reading frame that encodes for a polyprotein that is specifically cleaved. The polyprotein is cleaved into three specific proteins: the capsid (C), the premembrane (prM), and the envelope (E), along with seven non-structural proteins (NS1, NS2A, NS2B, NS3, NS4A, 2K, NS4B, and NS5). The SPONV capsid is icosahedral and the similar to other flaviviruses which have an enveloped consisting of glycoproteins. These glycoproteins aid the virus in infection, through receptor mediated endocytosis. Two strains of the Spondweni virus have been reported, the Chuku strain and the SA Ar 94 strain. The Chuku strain was the original strain isolated from a patient in Nigeria in 1952. This strain was originally misclassified as Zika virus, and this misidentification eventually lead to the 1955 South African SA 94 isolation from the Mansonia uniformis mosquito.  Both isolated SPONV strains are genetically similar, but they do exhibit a high degree of amino acid and nucleotide divergence, compared to the multiple ZIKV strains.

Transmission
Similar to Zika, the Spondweni virus’s primary vector of transmission is mosquitos from the genus Aedes. The two Spondweni virus strains have been isolated from multiple mosquito genera including Aedes fryeri/fowleri, Aedes cicumluteolus, Aedes cumminsi, Culex neavi, Culex univittatus, Eretmapodites silvestris, Mansonia africana, and Mansonia uniformis. However, the majority of SPONV isolations have been from one species of sylvatic mosquito, Ae. circumluteolus.

The degree of infection and dissemination of both strains differs by primary vector species. In regards to Chuku strain,  no detectable infection or dissemination has been found in two different Aedes species (Ae. albopictus and Ae. aegypti) along with Culex quinquefasciatus. The SA Ar 94 strain had been observed causing dissemination infection in Ae. albopictus, but the other two resulted in failed transmission. When the Chuku stain of SPONV was tested to see if it could successfully transmit into the Ae. aegypti mosquito (the dominant vector of ZIKV), it failed.

Little information is available on the potential amplification and maintenance of SPONV in numerous hosts species. Intensive field studies have been carried out in areas with high SPONV transmission, to eliminate potential host species. Numerous isolations of both SPONV strain types along with evidence of antibodies to the two strains were not detected in any rodent or birds collected in South Africa in 1958, leading to the speculation that these species were unlikely amplification and transmission of the virus.  Experimental work has demonstrated that SPONV can infect non-human primates. Due to its serological cross-reactivity and similar clinical presentations with ZIKV, SPONV may be maintained and transmitted in a sylvatic cycle to nonhuman primates and certain species of mosquitoes.

Signs and symptoms
Successful transmission and infection by either SPONV strain can result in the infectious disease known as Spondweni fever. Less is known about the clinical presentation of Spondweni virus infections, since a large problem with misdiagnosis is seen, as other viral infections like Zika. The majority of SPONV infections have been reported as asymptomatic. However, in certain Spondweni virus cases, signs and symptoms can appear as early as three days after infection. Six cases of Spondweni virus infections have been well documented, and the signs and symptoms parallel closely to Zika fever. Symptoms included:
 fever
 headache
 nausea
 myalgia
 greyish mucoid lining on the posterior pharynx
 arthralgia
 vertigo
 conjunctivitis
 maculopapular and pruritic rash
 epistaxis, photophobia
 vomiting, and disorientation.

While most reported symptomatic Spondweni virus infections have mild to moderate febrile illness that last for a short duration, incidences of more serious symptoms and illnesses have been associated with the virus. More serious complications have occurred, including conjunctivitis, hematuria, hematospermia, aphthous ulcer, and epistaxis.

Diagnosis of Spondweni viral infection would be to screen blood samples from infected individuals for the presence of the positive-sense, single-stranded RNA virion through the use of serologic assay, virus isolation, or PCR/qPCR. These methods also aid in the prevention of misdiagnosis of Spondweni viral infection with other viral infections and infections with a similar clinical symptom array which includes Zika fever, dengue fever, Lassa fever, rickettsial infection, leptospirosis, and typhoid fever.

References

Flaviviruses